There are 29 exchanges in Africa, representing 38 nations' capital markets.

21 of the 29 stock exchanges in Africa are members of the African Securities Exchanges Association (ASEA). ASEA members are indicated below by an asterisk (*).

The Egyptian Exchange (EGX), founded in 1883, is the oldest stock exchange in Africa. One of the oldest bourses (exchanges) on the continent is the Casablanca Stock Exchange of Morocco, founded in 1929 and the JSE Limited in 1887. Today the Casablanca stock exchange, in Morocco is the 3rd largest exchange in Africa, while Johannesburg Stock Exchange is the first, and the Nigerian Stock Exchange (NSE) is the second.

There are several notable countries on the continent that do not have a stock exchange. The most notable is Ethiopia, although it does have a commodities exchange in Addis Ababa. In January 2021 a capital market bill was tabled to Ethiopian lawmakers that would establish a stock exchange through a public-private partnership.

List

See also

Central banks and currencies of Africa
Economy of Africa
List of stock exchanges
Stock exchanges of small economies

References

ASEA

Stock Exchanges
Lists of stock exchanges
Stock exchanges